Asparagus longicladus is a species of flowering plant in the family Asparagaceae, native to Mozambique, Zimbabwe, Botswana and the Caprivi Strip.

References

longicladus
Flora of Botswana
Flora of the Caprivi Strip
Flora of Mozambique
Flora of Zimbabwe
Plants described in 1921
Taxa named by N. E. Brown